The 1937 Manhattan Jaspers football team was an American football team that represented Manhattan College as an independent during the 1937 college football season.  In its sixth and final season under head coach Chick Meehan, the team compiled a 6–3–1 record and outscored opponents by a total of 86 to 84.

Schedule

References

Manhattan
Manhattan Jaspers football seasons
Manhattan Jaspers football